Pseudopontia is a genus of butterflies found only in wet forests of tropical Africa. It is the only genus in the subfamily Pseudopontiinae. It was traditionally thought to contain only one species (monotypic), Pseudopontia paradoxa. However, a recent study showed there are at least five species of Pseudopontia which can be distinguished genetically and by details of wing veins. Each is found primarily in a different part of Africa, though several of the species have overlapping geographic distributions.

It is considered paradoxical because, despite being a true butterfly (Papilionoidea), its antennae do not have the characteristic clubbed ends which are otherwise diagnostic of butterflies (Rhopalocera).

Species
 Pseudopontia paradoxa R. Felder, 1869;  found in rainforests in Cameroon, Nigeria, Côte d'Ivoire, Ghana, and Gabon
 Pseudopontia australis F.A. Dixey, 1923 (formerly considered a subspecies);  found in Democratic Republic of the Congo (Kinshasa), Congo (Brazzaville), and eastern Gabon, usually at low elevation
 Pseudopontia gola S. Safian and K. Mitter, 2011;  found in Sierra Leone and Liberia in far western Africa
 Pseudopontia mabira K. Mitter and S. Collins, 2011;  found in central Africa: in Uganda and Democratic Republic of the Congo within about 5 degrees latitude north and south of the Equator
 Pseudopontia zambezi K. Mitter and W. De Prins, 2011;  found in riverine forests in the southern African highlands: in Democratic Republic of the Congo, Zambia, and Angola, at elevations over 800 m above sea level

References
Plötz, C. (1870) Pseudopontia Calabarica n. gen. et n. sp. Stettiner Entomologischer Zeitung, 31, 348–349, 1 pl.
Felder, R. (1869) [no title]. Petites Nouvelles Entomologiques, 1, 30–31.
Felder, R. (1870) Gonophlebia (Globiceps), Paradoxa (Felder). Petites Nouvelles Entomologiques, 1, 95.
Dixey, F.A. (1923) Pseudopontia paradoxa: its affinities, mimetic relations, and geographical races. Proceedings of the Entomological Society (London), lxi–lxvii +plate B.
Mitter, K.T., Larsen, T.B., et al. (2011). The butterfly subfamily Pseudopontiinae is not monobasic: marked genetic diversity and morphology reveal three new species of Pseudopontia (Lepidoptera: Pieridae). Systematic Entomology 36: 139-163.

External links
Pseudopontiinae, TOL
Pseudopontia, funet
Images representing Pseudopontia at Consortium for the Barcode of Life

Pieridae
Pieridae genera